"This Christmas" is a song by American soul musician Donny Hathaway released in 1970 by Atco Records. The song gained renewed popularity when it was included in 1991 on Atco Records' revised edition of their 1968 Soul Christmas compilation album and has since become a modern Christmas standard, with the American Society of Composers, Authors and Publishers reporting that it was the 30th most-performed holiday song of all time.

Phil Upchurch said the song was "absolutely the premiere holiday song written by an African American". It was written by Hathaway and Nadine McKinnor.

History
"This Christmas" was recorded at Audio Finishers Studio on Ontario Street, Chicago in the fall of 1970. Ric Powell (see credits below) said that Hathaway was "very upbeat during the session" and that he "knew what he wanted to do musically and the impact he wanted to make with this song" regarding the representation of African Americans in Christmas music. On writing the song with Hathaway (who died in 1979), Nadine McKinnor said she felt "blessed to have written with Donny a song that celebrates the possibilities, the expectations, and the anticipation of Christmas and the good fun and happy loving times", and that the creation of the song "was a God plan. God was in this plan. And Donny Hathaway was a genius."

"This Christmas" was released as a single in 1970. It initially saw little success, as it was listed just once on any of Billboard magazine's weekly published music charts in the 1970s, specifically Billboard special Christmas Singles chart (on the week ending December 23, 1972, at position No. 11). But in recent years, the song has made it onto a number of Billboard weekly music charts. In addition to making its first appearance on the main Billboard Hot 100 songs chart in late December 2020 (at position No. 39), Hathaway's "This Christmas" has also appeared on these other Billboard music charts: Global 200 (No. 62 chart peak in early January 2021), Holiday 100 (No. 25 chart peak in early January 2014), Holiday Digital Song Sales (No. 36 chart peak in early January 2020), Holiday Streaming Songs (No. 27 chart peak in December 2020), Hot 100 Recurrents (No. 10 in December 2020), R&B Digital Song Sales (No. 10 chart peak in early January 2020), R&B Streaming Songs (No. 6 chart peak in early January 2021), R&B/Hip-Hop Streaming Songs (No. 6 chart peak in early January 2021), and Streaming Songs (No. 27 chart peak in early January 2021).

In 1991, Atco Records released a revised edition of their 1968 compilation album Soul Christmas that included "This Christmas".

Credits
 Vocals, keyboard, bass: Donny Hathaway
 Writing: Hathaway (as "Donny Pitts"), Nadine McKinnor
 Electric guitar: Phil Upchurch
 Drums: Morris Jennings
 Drums, bass drum, congas, sleigh bells: Ric Powell
 Baritone saxophone: Willie Henderson
 Trombones: Louis Satterfield

Charts

Jess Glynne version

English singer and songwriter Jess Glynne released a cover version of the song as a single on 12 November 2020. The single peaked at number three on the UK Singles Chart. Daniel Welsh of HuffPost UK rated Glynne's version three out of five stars, writing that "fans of both Jess Glynne and background Christmas music" would enjoy this version. It’s Glynne’s last single to be released under Atlantic Records due to her parting ways with them in 2022.

Background
Talking about the song, Glynne said: I chose 'This Christmas' by Donny Hathaway as I love the tone of this record and I'm thankful that Amazon Music have given me the opportunity to do my own version of it for them. This year has been such a hard one and there's no doubt this Christmas is going to be difficult for so many people. Music is so important as it gives us moments of escapism and I think more than ever having an uplifting feel good song is so necessary.

Charts

Certifications and sales

Other cover versions 

After the 1991 release of Atco Records' Soul Christmas, the song became particularly notable for the popularity of its numerous covers by other artists, particularly well-known pop, smooth jazz and R&B artists. Prior to this re-release, artists who recorded cover versions included The Whispers, The Temptations, Gladys Knight & the Pips, as well as Patti LaBelle, who titled a Christmas album after the song. A previously unheard recording of the song by Diana Ross from 1974 was released on Motown Records' compilation album Christmas in the City in 1993. In 1996, Patti LaBelle performed the song at the lighting of the American National Christmas Tree. During the performance her backing singers failed to appear, yet a frustrated LaBelle carried on without her entourage before President Clinton appeared to light the tree.

Elliott Yamin released his version as his debut single in December 2006, which reached No. 21 on Billboard Adult Contemporary chart.

A cover of the song by Chris Brown, recorded for the 2007 film of the same name, peaked at No. 62 on the Billboard Hot 100 chart and was certified gold by the RIAA. Covers by Seal and by American band Train each went to No. 1 on the Adult Contemporary chart in 2015 and 2016, respectively.

Lady Antebellum covered the song for the 2012 Christmas album On This Winter's Night. In December 2012, The Philadelphia Tribune music critic Nekesa Mumbi Moody praised Lady Antebellum's recording and the rest of the album. However, Ludovic Hunter-Tilney of the Financial Times panned the album and called the trio's cover recording a "slickly insincere 1980s soul."

CeeLo Green covered the song for Cee Lo's Magic Moment (2012). Also in December 2012, Alan Sculley of Asbury Park Press praised CeeLo Green's recording as "a good Stevie Wonder". One of The StarPhoenix music critics called CeeLo's takes on the song and "What Christmas Means to Me" not as good as original versions but "worth a listen" with "enough originality". However, Melissa Ruggieri of The Atlanta Journal-Constitution criticised CeeLo's version as skippable and "surprisingly dull".

In December 2016, Mark Daniell of the Ottawa Sun praised versions by the following artists as "good": Lady Antebellum, Chris Brown, Macy Gray, and CeeLo Green.

See also
 List of number-one adult contemporary singles of 2016 (U.S.)

References

External links

1970 songs
1970 singles
American Christmas songs
Atco Records singles
CeeLo Green songs
Chris Brown songs
Christina Aguilera songs
Diana Ross songs
Donny Hathaway songs
2006 debut singles
Elliott Yamin songs
Lady A songs
Patti LaBelle songs
Jess Glynne songs